The 1997 Virtual Pool 2 Mosconi Cup, the fourth edition of the annual nine-ball pool competition between teams representing Europe and the United States, took place 18–21 December 1997 at the York Hall in Bethnal Green, London, England.

Team USA won the Mosconi Cup by defeating Team Europe 13–8.


Teams

Results

Thursday, 18 December

Session 1

Friday, 19 December

Session 2

Session 3

Saturday, 20 December

Session 4

Session 5

Sunday, 21 December

Session 6

Session 7

References

External links
 Official homepage

1997
1997 in cue sports
1997 sports events in London
Sport in the London Borough of Tower Hamlets
1997 in English sport
December 1997 sports events in the United Kingdom